Serhiy Danylchenko (born April 27, 1974 in Kharkiv) is a retired Ukrainian male boxer, who won a Bantamweight Bronze medal at the 2000 Summer Olympics. A year later, at the 2001 World Amateur Boxing Championships, he won the bronze medal in the same division.

Olympic results 
1st round bye
Defeated Dingko Singh (India) 14-5
Defeated Justin Kane (Australia) RSC 4
Lost to Raimkul Malakhbekov (Russia) 10-15

Pro career
Danylchenko began his professional career in 2002 and only fought once, retiring with a pro record of 1-0-0.

References
 
 sports-reference

1974 births
Living people
Boxers at the 2000 Summer Olympics
Bantamweight boxers
Olympic bronze medalists for Ukraine
Olympic boxers of Ukraine
Place of birth missing (living people)
Olympic medalists in boxing
Sportspeople from Kharkiv
Ukrainian male boxers
AIBA World Boxing Championships medalists
Medalists at the 2000 Summer Olympics